The Caribbean bioregion is a biogeographic region that includes the islands of the Caribbean Sea and nearby Atlantic islands, which share a fauna, flora and mycobiota distinct from surrounding bioregions.

Geography
The Caribbean bioregion, as described by the World Wildlife Fund, includes the Greater Antilles (Cuba, Hispaniola, Puerto Rico, and Jamaica), the Lesser Antilles, the Lucayan archipelago (Bahamas and Turks and Caicos Islands), Southern Florida in the United States and Aruba, Bonaire, and Curaçao. The Lucayan archipelago lies north of the Caribbean in the Atlantic Ocean, but is part of the bioregion based on its flora and fauna. The bioregion does not include Trinidad and Tobago; these islands rest on South America's continental shelf, and have been historically part of the South American continent. Trinidad and Tobago are part of the Orinoco bioregion.

The climate of the ecoregion is tropical, and varies from humid to arid. Geology and topography also vary, with larger mountainous islands of continental rock, volcanic islands, and low-lying coral and limestone islands. The bioregion includes tropical moist forests, tropical dry forests, tropical pine forests, flooded grasslands and savannas, xeric shrublands, and mangroves.

Flora and fauna
The Caribbean bioregion's distinct fauna, flora and mycobiota was shaped by long periods of physical separation from the neighboring continents, allowing animals, fungi and plants to evolve in isolation. Other animals, fungi and plants arrived via long-distance oceanic dispersal or island hopping from North America and South America.

The bioregion has many plant species, including many endemics. There are about 200 endemic genera of plants. Wallenia, the largest endemic genus, has thirty species, and six other genera have ten or more species.

Three mammal families are endemic to the bioregion; the Solenodontidae includes two species of solenodon, with one species on Cuba and the other on Hispaniola. Fossil evidence shows that the family was once more widespread in North America. The family Nesophontidae, or the West Indian shrews, contained a single genus, Nesophontes, which inhabited Cuba, Hispaniola, Puerto Rico and the Cayman Islands. All members of the family are now believed to be extinct. The Capromyidae, or hutias, include a number of species, mainly from the Greater Antilles and the Lucayan Archipelago. Many other rodents of the Caribbean are also restricted to the region.

Ecoregions

Tropical and subtropical moist broadleaf forests
Cuban moist forests (Cuba)
Hispaniolan moist forests (Dominican Republic, Haiti)
Jamaican moist forests (Jamaica)
Leeward Islands moist forests (Antigua, British Virgin Islands, Guadeloupe, Montserrat, Nevis, Saint Kitts, US Virgin Islands)
Puerto Rican moist forests (Puerto Rico)
South Florida rocklands (United States)
Windward Islands moist forests (Dominica, Grenada, Martinique, Saint Lucia, Saint Vincent and the Grenadines)

Tropical and subtropical dry broadleaf forests
Bahamian dry forests (Bahamas)
Cayman Islands dry forests (Cayman Islands)
Cuban dry forests (Cuba)
Hispaniolan dry forests (Dominican Republic, Haiti)
Jamaican dry forests (Jamaica)
Lesser Antillean dry forests (Anguilla, Antigua and Barbuda, Grenada, Martinique, Montserrat, Netherlands Antilles, Saint Lucia, Saint Vincent and the Grenadines)
Puerto Rican dry forests (Puerto Rico)

Tropical and subtropical coniferous forests
Bahamian pineyards (The Bahamas)
Cuban pine forests (Cuba)
Hispaniolan pine forests (Dominican Republic, Haiti)

Flooded grasslands and savannas
Cuban wetlands (Cuba)
Enriquillo wetlands (Dominican Republic, Haiti)
Everglades (United States)

Deserts and xeric shrublands
Aruba-Curaçao-Bonaire cactus scrub (Aruba, Bonaire, Curaçao)
Cayman Islands xeric scrub (Cayman Islands)
Cuban cactus scrub (Cuba)
Leeward Islands xeric scrub (Anguilla, Antigua and Barbuda, British Virgin Islands,  Guadeloupe, Saint Martin, Saint Barthelemy, Saba, US Virgin Islands)
Windward Islands xeric scrub (Barbados, Dominica, Grenada, Martinique, Saint Lucia, Saint Vincent and the Grenadines)

Mangrove
Bahamian mangroves (Bahamas, Turks and Caicos Islands)
Greater Antilles mangroves (Cuba, Dominican Republic, Haiti, Jamaica, Puerto Rico)
Lesser Antilles mangroves (Lesser Antilles)

See also
List of Neotropical ecoregions by bioregion

References

 
 
Ecoregions of the Americas
Geography of the Caribbean
Natural history of the Caribbean
Neotropical realm
Hispaniola